Sandoval  is a village in Marion County, Illinois, United States. The population was 1,157 at the 2020 census.

Geography

U.S. Route 50 passes through the village center as Missouri Avenue, leading east  to Salem, the county seat, and west  to Carlyle. U.S. Route 51 runs through the east side of the village on Mine Street, leading north  to Vandalia and south  to Centralia.

Prairie Creek, a southwest-flowing tributary Lost Creek, crosses the southeast corner of the village. Via Lost Creek and its outflow to Crooked Creek, Sandoval is part of the Kaskaskia River watershed leading to the Mississippi River.

History
In the 1890s, Sandoval was a sundown town, prohibiting African Americans from entering or living in the town.

Demographics
As of the census of 2000, there were 1,434 people, 562 households, and 396 families residing in the village. The racial makeup of the village was 97.77% White, 0.42% African American, 0.84% Native American, 0.28% Asian, 0.21% from other races, and 0.49% from two or more races. Hispanic or Latino of any race were 0.98% of the population.

There were 562 households, out of which 38.6% had children under the age of 18 living with them, 48.8% were married couples living together, 16.9% had a female householder with no husband present, and 29.4% were non-families. 25.3% of all households were made up of individuals, and 10.1% had someone living alone who was 65 years of age or older. The average household size was 2.55 and the average family size was 3.04.

In the village, the population was spread out, with 30.1% under the age of 18, 8.4% from 18 to 24, 28.5% from 25 to 44, 22.1% from 45 to 64, and 10.9% who were 65 years of age or older. The median age was 34 years. For every 100 females, there were 92.7 males. For every 100 females age 18 and over, there were 85.2 males.

The median income for a household in the village was $30,000, and the median income for a family was $35,700. Males had a median income of $29,191 versus $19,833 for females. The per capita income for the village was $14,739. About 17.1% of families and 21.1% of the population were below the poverty line, including 31.5% of those under age 18 and 8.6% of those age 65 or over.

See also
 List of municipalities in Illinois

References

External links

Villages in Marion County, Illinois
Villages in Illinois
Sundown towns in Illinois